What's It All About? is the second and final album by British singer-songwriter Chris Hardman, better known as Lil' Chris. The album was released on October 6, 2008, following the release of the album's lead and only single "We Don't Have To Take Our Clothes Off" more than a year earlier on October 19, 2007.

The album was in fact an incompleted studio album; only six songs were recorded for the project, before RCA Records pulled the plug on any further studio recordings following the poor performance of the album's lead single. However, for contractual reasons, RCA were required to honour Chris' two-album deal, and therefore decided to package the six recorded songs with seven songs previously released on his debut album, Lil' Chris.

The album was then subsequently launched alongside Hardman's Everybody Loves Lil' Chris TV series for Channel 4 in an attempt to boost sales, but only managed to peak at #94 on the UK Albums Chart. The album remains Hardman's last release before his death in 2015.

Singles
 "We Don't Have To Take Our Clothes Off" was released as the album's only single on October 19, 2007. The single was released as a download-only, as the CD single release was pulled at the last minute. The single was backed with live version of "I Never Noticed", a media virus remix and a live version of the previously unreleased track "Taste Me" (a studio version has never been released). The single peaked at #63 on the UK Singles Chart.

Track listing
 All tracks produced by Ray Hedges and Nigel Butler.
 Additional production on "Fighters" and "Get Delirious" by Dougal Drummond.

Charts

References

External links
Official website
 Lil Chris official Myspace

2008 albums
RCA Records albums